Betanja is a small settlement above Matavun in the Municipality of Divača in the Littoral  region of Slovenia.

References

External links 
Betanja on Geopedia

Populated places in the Municipality of Divača